Lake Kathryn is an alpine lake in Custer County, Idaho, United States, located in the Sawtooth Mountains in the Sawtooth National Recreation Area.  There are no trails that lead to Lake Kathryn, although it is most easily accessed from Sawtooth National Forest trail 154 along Redfish Lake Creek.

Lake Kathryn is in the Sawtooth Wilderness, and a wilderness permit can be obtained at a registration box at trailheads or wilderness boundaries.  Just to the north of Lake Kathryn are the Upper Redfish Lakes.

Lake Kathryn is named after Kathryn Mills.

References

See also
 List of lakes of the Sawtooth Mountains (Idaho)
 Sawtooth National Forest
 Sawtooth National Recreation Area
 Sawtooth Range (Idaho)

Lakes of Idaho
Lakes of Custer County, Idaho
Glacial lakes of the United States
Glacial lakes of the Sawtooth Wilderness